The Chestnut Hill is a historic apartment building at 219 Commonwealth Avenue in the village of Chestnut Hill in Newton, Massachusetts, USA.

History
Designed by the Boston architect Francis W. Chandler in the Tudor Revival style of architecture, it was built in 1899 for Dana Estes, one of the developers responsible for the extension of Commonwealth Avenue to Auburndale. On September 4, 1986, it was added to the National Register of Historic Places.

Description
It is a -story wood-frame building with fieldstone on the ground floor, and half-timbered stucco finish above. The wall surfaces are in places embellished by decorative mastic elements.

See also
 National Register of Historic Places listings in Newton, Massachusetts

References

National Register of Historic Places in Newton, Massachusetts
Apartment buildings on the National Register of Historic Places in Massachusetts
Buildings and structures in Newton, Massachusetts
Historic district contributing properties in Massachusetts